Luana Pavan (born 3 March 1963) is an Italian former footballer who played as a goalkeeper for the Italy women's national football team. At club level she collected four women's Serie A winner's medals and three Coppa Italia winner's medals.

Club career 
Pavan began her football career at Belluno, where she played alongside fellow promising youngster Carolina Morace. A tall goalkeeper with what the Dizionario del Calcio Italiano described as a "fisico da indossatrice", Pavan was an iconic member of the Trani team of the 1980s "golden era" of Italian women's football. She won three league titles and married the goalkeeper of Trani's men's team, but stopped playing during 1985–86 due to pregnancy.

In 1987–88 she returned to play for minnows Somma Vesuviana, but a mooted return to Trani failed to materialise when the Apulian giants folded at the end of the season. Instead Pavan linked up with Giugliano Campania, where she won a League and Cup double in 1988–89 and a Cup in 1990 before the club went bust upon the withdrawal of sponsors Gran Bazar. Pavan quit top level football and moved with her family to Abruzzo, where she played for local non-league teams in Vasto. She made a brief return to Serie A with Lugo in 1998–99.

International career 
With the Italy women's national football team, Pavan was a longstanding understudy to Eva Russo. She made her debut in August 1982 in a 2–1 home upset by Scotland and won the last of her six official caps as a substitute in a 1–1 friendly draw with England staged at Loakes Park, High Wycombe on 11 November 1989.

Personal life 
Pavan was married to Felice and had children Valentina and Alessandra. The demands of motherhood and her other career as a chemicals expert reduced her ability to keep playing football at the top level.

Honours

Club 
Trani
 Serie A (3): 1984, 1985, 1985–1986
 Coppa Italia (1): 1983

GB Campania
 Serie A (1): 1988–89
 Coppa Italia (1): 1988–89, 1989–90

References

External links
Profile at Lega Nazionale Dilettanti 

1963 births
Living people
Italian women's footballers
Italy women's international footballers
Women's association football goalkeepers
Sportspeople from Treviso
Serie A (women's football) players
A.C.F. Trani 80 players
Footballers from Veneto